Happy Birthday! is the second studio album by German electronic music duo Modeselektor. It was released on BPitch Control on 10 September 2007.

Critical reception

Mark Pytlik of Pitchfork gave the album a 7.4 out of 10, saying, "what's interesting about Happy Birthday! isn't just that it fuses together the most unfashionable or discarded elements of electronic music's recent history, but that it manages to sound so fresh in doing so."

Track listing

Charts

References

External links
 

2007 albums
Modeselektor albums
BPitch Control albums